T-112 was a minesweeper of the Soviet Navy during World War II and the Cold War. Upon completion she was transferred to the Soviet Union under Lend-Lease as T-112; she was never returned to the United States. The ship was renamed several times in Soviet service and was finally abandoned in January 1991. Her hulk was extant . Because of the Cold War, the U.S. Navy was unaware of the ship's status and the vessel remained on the American Naval Vessel Register until she was struck on 1 January 1983.

Career 
Agent was laid down on 8 April 1942 by the Tampa Shipbuilding Co., Tampa, Florida; launched on 1 November 1942; and completed 10 July 1943. She was transferred to the Soviet Navy that same day as T-112. She was never returned to U.S. custody.

In Soviet service, the ship was renamed TB-21 on 15 October 1955; VTR-2Y on 8 March 1956; and UTS-288 on 20 April 1972. The ship was abandoned on 31 January 1991, and,  her hulk was extant.

Due to the ongoing Cold War, the U.S. Navy was unaware of the fate of the former Agent. They had reclassified the vessel as MSF-139 on 7 February 1955, and kept her on the American Naval Vessel Register until she was struck on 1 January 1983.

References

External links
 NavSource Online: Mine Warfare Vessel Photo Archive – Agent (MSF 139) – ex-AM-139 – ex-AMc-116

Admirable-class minesweepers
Ships built in Tampa, Florida
1942 ships
World War II minesweepers of the United States
Admirable-class minesweepers of the Soviet Navy
World War II minesweepers of the Soviet Union
Cold War minesweepers of the Soviet Union